Cocodrilos de Caracas is a Venezuelan professional basketball club based in Caracas. Established in 1990, the club competes in the Venezuelan SuperLiga and has won six national championships. The Cocodrilos' home games are played at the Parque Naciones Unidas.

History
The city of Caracas had known various teams that had played in the national premier basketball leagues. In the end of 1990, Dr. Guillermo Valentiner acquired the capital's basketball team and named it Cocodrilos de Caracas. In the first season of the team, it finished in fifth place. The team won its first national league after only one year, in 1992.

Trophies
Venezuelan LPB / Superliga: 6
1974 1992, 2000, 2008, 2010, 2013

Season by season

Notable alumni

Players

 Carl Herrera (2003–2004)
 Garly Sojo
 Luis David Montero
 Rowan Barrett 
 Leandro Garcia Morales 
 Cedric Ball 
 Chris Childs 
 Ramel Curry (2005)
 Kris Lang (2005)
 Tony Dawson 
 Roy Hairston 
 Anthony Mason 
 Lee Nailon 
 Carl Elliott 
 Kevin Freeman 
 Ray Jackson

Coaches
To appear in this section a player must have either:
- Set a club record or won an individual award as a professional coach.
- Coached at least one official international match for a senior national team at any time.

Notes

References

Basketball teams established in 1990
Basketball teams in Venezuela
Sport in Caracas